Juan Rodrigo Gutiérrez Arenas (born 8 July 1990) is a Chilean footballer that currently plays for Chilean First Division B club Rangers as a midfielder.

External links
 

1990 births
Living people
Footballers from Santiago
Chilean footballers
Primera B de Chile players
Chilean Primera División players
A.C. Barnechea footballers
Ñublense footballers
Unión San Felipe footballers
Deportes Temuco footballers
Deportes Iberia footballers
Cobresal footballers
Rangers de Talca footballers
Association football midfielders